Wynonna Earp is a Canadian-American supernatural Western horror television series developed by Emily Andras that airs on Syfy and CTV Sci-Fi Channel (formerly known as Space). The series follows Wynonna Earp, the great-great-granddaughter of legendary lawman Wyatt Earp, and is based on the comic book series by Beau Smith.

The series premiered in the United States on Syfy on April 1, 2016 at 10 p.m., and on CHCH-DT in Canada on April 4, 2016 at 9 p.m. It was renewed for a second season on July 23, 2016. In March 2017, Bell Media announced the new partnership between Space and SEVEN24 Films as Canadian co-producers of Wynonna Earp, with the series moving from CHCH to Space. Season 2 premiered simultaneously on Syfy and Space on June 9, 2017, at 10 p.m. Wynonna Earp was renewed for a third season by Space and Syfy on July 22, 2017. Season 3 premiered on Syfy and Space on July 20, 2018, with the broadcast time changed to 9 p.m. On July 21, 2018, Syfy and Space announced the renewal for a fourth season. In September 2019, Space became the CTV Sci-Fi Channel. Season 4 premiered on Syfy and CTV Sci-Fi Channel on July 26, 2020 at 10 p.m.

In the United Kingdom, Wynonna Earp premiered on Spike on July 29, 2016. It premiered in Australia on Spike on February 5, 2017. Total episode running time is 43 minutes (including opening title sequence and closing credits roll). The titles of episodes are based on country and western songs.

Series overview

Episodes

Season 1 (2016)

Season 2 (2017)

Season 3 (2018)

The episode titles for Season 3 were released on June 19, 2018. The first episode of the season was released as a special broadcast by Syfy on July 16, in advance of the season premiere on July 20, 2018.

Season 4 (2020–21)

Ratings

Notes

References

External links
 
 
  Wynonna Earp at Space (archive)
  Wynonna Earp at CHCH-DT (2016 archive)
  Wynonna Earp at CHCH-DT (2017 archive)
 Wynonna Earp at SEVEN24 Films
 
  Wynonna Earp at Garn's Guides
  Wynonna Earp at Next Episode
 
 

Lists of American drama television series episodes
Lists of American fantasy television series episodes
Lists of Canadian drama television series episodes
Lists of American science fiction television series episodes